Loughmoe East is a civil parish in County Tipperary, Ireland.(Gaelic: Na Cealla Beaga).  Also called CALLABEG, or KILNASEAR, the parish, in the barony of ELIOGARTY, County TIPPERARY, is in the province of MUNSTER, about 2 miles south-east of Templemore. This parish is situated on the river Suir, which separates it from Loughmoe-West, and on the road from Templemore to Thurles, and comprises 3417 statute acres.

History
On the townland of Killahara is a very fine old castle, which formerly belonged to the Purcells, it was in 1837, the property of a Mr. Trant.  It had a rectory and vicarage, in the diocese of Cashel, and was part of the union of Templetuohy and corps of the prebend of Kilbragh in the cathedral of Cashel: the tithes amounted to £249. 17s. 9d.  There was a pay school, in which are about So boys and 20 girls.  Originally containing 1600 inhabitants in 1837, it was devastated by the Great Famine.

Townlands
Its townlands include:
Ballyduag
Baronstown
Brownstown
Clogharailybeg
Clogharailymore
Clonamuckogemore
Cloone
Coogulla
Curraghmore
Derry
Gortnahaha
Gortreagh
Graiguefrahane
Kilbrickane
Kilcoke
Kilcurkree
Killanigan
Killeenleigh
Kilnaseer
Penane
Skeagh

See also

 Loughmoe West

References

 Loughmoe East